DeKalb County is a county located in the U.S. state of Illinois. As of the 2020 United States Census, the population was 100,420. Its county seat is Sycamore.

DeKalb County is part of the Chicago-Naperville-Elgin, IL-IN-WI Metropolitan Statistical Area.

History
DeKalb County was formed on 4 March 1837, out of Kane County, Illinois. The county was named for Johann de Kalb, a German (Bavarian) hero of the American Revolutionary War. DeKalb County's area is approximately 632.7 square miles, and is located 63 miles west of Chicago. There are 19 townships in the county with the county seat at Sycamore.

Between 1834 and 1837, settlements were formed in DeKalb County along streams and wooded areas due to fertile soil, wild game, and food and water opportunities. Primary growth stemmed from the introduction of the railroad which brought easier methods of transportation and opportunities for industrial growth. Early industries based in DeKalb County included Sandwich Mfg. Co, Marsh Harvester Co, barbed wire, and Gurler Bros Pure Milk Co.

The county is noted for agriculture. In 1852, the DeKalb Agricultural Society produced the county's first Agricultural Fair, in Sycamore. Eventually farmers, businessmen, bankers and newspapermen organized to become the DeKalb County Soil Improvement Association, which later was split into DeKalb County Farm Bureau and DeKalb Agricultural Association (DEKALB AgResearch, Inc., Monsanto). DeKalb County is credited with being the birthplace of the Farm Bureau movement. DeKalb County is also the 2nd largest hog producing county in Illinois and the 66th largest in the nation.

Education has played an important role in the area with Northern Illinois University located in DeKalb and Kishwaukee College located in Malta. Except for 2020 (COVID-19), a major fair has been held each year since 1887 at the Sandwich Fairgrounds in Sandwich.

Pronunciation
Unlike similarly spelled locations, such as DeKalb County, Georgia, DeKalb denizens from Illinois pronounce the county name  , with an L sound, as in German.

Geography

Climate and weather

Adjacent counties

 Boone County - north
 McHenry County - northeast
 Kane County - east
 Kendall County - southeast
 LaSalle County - south
 Lee County - west
 Ogle County - west
 Winnebago County - northwest

Major highways

  Interstate 88
  US Route 30
  US Route 34
  Illinois Route 23
  Illinois Route 38
  Illinois Route 64
  Illinois Route 72
  Illinois Route 110

Demographics

As of the 2010 United States Census, there were 105,160 people, 38,484 households, and 23,781 families residing in the county. The racial makeup of the county was 85.1% white, 6.4% black or African American, 2.3% Asian, 0.3% American Indian, 3.9% from other races, and 2.0% from two or more races. Those of Hispanic or Latino origin made up 10.1% of the population. In terms of ancestry, 32.6% were German, 17.5% were Irish, 8.7% were English, 7.0% were Polish, 6.4% were Italian, 6.3% were Swedish, and 4.7% were Norwegian.

Of the 38,484 households, 31.9% had children under the age of 18 living with them, 47.2% were married couples living together, 10.2% had a female householder with no husband present, 38.2% were non-families, and 25.8% of all households were made up of individuals. The average household size was 2.56 and the average family size was 3.11. The median age was 29.3 years.

The median income for a household in the county was $54,002 and the median income for a family was $70,713. Males had a median income of $50,192 versus $35,246 for females. The per capita income for the county was $24,179. About 7.7% of families and 14.6% of the population were below the poverty line, including 13.2% of those under age 18 and 4.5% of those age 65 or over.

Communities

Cities

 DeKalb
 Genoa
 Sandwich (mostly)
 Sycamore

Town
 Cortland

Villages

 Hinckley
 Kingston
 Kirkland
 Lee (part)
 Malta
 Maple Park (part)
 Shabbona
 Somonauk (mostly)
 Waterman

Unincorporated Communities

 Afton Center
 Charter Grove
 Clare
 Colvin Park
 East Paw Paw
 Elva
 Esmond
 Fairdale
 Five Points
 Franks
 McGirr
 New Lebanon
 Rollo
 Shabbona Grove
 Wilkinson

Townships

 Afton
 Clinton
 Cortland
 DeKalb
 Franklin
 Genoa
 Kingston
 Malta
 Mayfield
 Milan
 Paw Paw
 Pierce
 Sandwich
 Shabbona
 Somonauk
 South Grove
 Squaw Grove
 Sycamore
 Victor

Politics
As part of Northern Illinois, DeKalb County was a stronghold for the Free Soil Party in its early elections – being among nine Illinois counties to support Martin Van Buren in 1848 – and became overwhelmingly Republican for the century following that party's formation. The only time it did not back the official GOP nominee between 1856 and 1988 was in 1912 when the Republican Party was mortally divided and Progressive Theodore Roosevelt won almost half the county's vote.

During this time, it rejected Democrats even in statewide and national landslides. In 1936, Republican candidate Alf Landon, won DeKalb County by double digits while losing 46 of 48 states. Landon held Franklin D. Roosevelt to only 43 percent of DeKalb County's vote, the most he would garner in the county during his four runs for president. Even Barry Goldwater – renowned for his antagonism towards the establishment – won by seven percent despite losing sixteen percent of the vote compared to Richard Nixon in 1960.

In 1992, with the third-party entrance of Ross Perot siphoning votes from Republican George H. W. Bush, Bill Clinton became the first Democrat to carry the county in 140 years. Since then, DeKalb County has become more of a swing county in national elections, owing to the growth of the largely Democratic student population in DeKalb. However, it has bucked the Democratic trend seen in most counties dominated by college towns. Republicans still hold most county-level elected offices, and all municipalities outside of the city of DeKalb are still powerfully Republican.

In 2008, an Illinois son, Barack Obama, became the first Democrat to win an absolute majority since Van Buren in the county's first-ever Presidential election of 1840. Obama repeated this in 2012, but gains for third-party candidates caused both major-party candidates to underperform in 2016.

Education

Tertiary
Northern Illinois University is in the county.

K-12
The following school districts have territory in the county, no matter how slight, even if their schools and/or administrative headquarters are in other counties:

K-12:
 Belvidere Consolidated Unit School District 100
 Central Community Unit School District 301
 Community Unit School District 300
 DeKalb Community Unit School District 428
 Earlville Community Unit School District 9
 Genoa-Kingston Community Unit School District 424
 Hinckley-Big Rock Community Unit School District 429
 Hiawatha Community Unit School District 426
 Indian Creek Community Unit District 425
 Kaneland Community Unit School District 302
 Lee Center Community Unit School District 271
 Leland Community Unit School District 1
 Sandwich Community Unit School District 430
 Somonauk Community Unit School District 432
 Sycamore Community Unit School District 427

Secondary:
 Rochelle Township High School District 212

Elementary:
 Creston Community Consolidated School District 161
 Eswood Community Consolidated District 269
 Steward Elementary School District 220

See also
 National Register of Historic Places listings in DeKalb County, Illinois

References

References
 
 US Census Bureau 2007 TIGER/Line Shapefiles
 
 US National Atlas

Further reading
 Eric W. Mogren. Native Soil: A History of the DeKalb County Farm Bureau (DeKalb: Northern Illinois University Press, 2005), 288 pp.

External links
 
 History pages for DeKalb County towns and cities
 
 DeKalb County Youth Service Bureau
 Taming the Wild Prairie: A History of DeKalb County, Illinois, 1837-1900, Illinois Historical Digitization Projects at Northern Illinois University Libraries
 DeKalb County Online Newspaper

 
1837 establishments in Illinois
Chicago metropolitan area
Illinois counties
Populated places established in 1837